Ulrik Frederik Anton de Schouboe (1782–1863) was a Norwegian civil servant and politician.  He served as the County Governor of Stavanger, Lister og Mandal, and Nedenes counties during his career.

Schouboe was the son of the Governor Christian de Schouboe and Anna Magdalene Müller, and he was also the brother of Oluf Borch de Schouboe. He became a student in 1801 and he received his cand. jur. degree in 1804. Starting in 1807, he was employed by the Danske Kancelli. From 1812 to 1814, he was the Governor of Stavanger Amt. From 1814 to 1815, he was the Governor of Lister og Mandals Amt (the first after the dissolution of the union with Denmark) and then from 1815 to 1837, he was the Governor of Nedenes Amt.  From 1837 to 1859 he was a State Secretary for the government.

References

1782 births
1863 deaths
County governors of Norway